The R314 road is a regional road in County Mayo in Ireland.

The government legislation that defines the R314, the Roads Act 1993 (Classification of Regional Roads) Order 2012 (Statutory Instrument 54 of 2012), provides the following official description:

Béal an Mhuirthead — Ballycastle — Ballina, County Mayo

Between its junction with the R313 at Áit Tí Conain in the county of Mayo and its junction with N59 at Circular Road in the town of Ballina via Moing Eiriún, Gleann na Muaidhe, Béal Deirg, Ballycastle, Palmerstown Bridge, Killybrone; George Street, Market Street and Church Street at Killala; Meelick, Tawnaghmore Upper and Culleens in the county of Mayo: and Killala Road in the town of Ballina.

See also
 List of roads of County Mayo
 National primary road
 National secondary road
 Regional road
 Roads in Ireland

References

Regional roads in the Republic of Ireland
Roads in County Mayo